José Ramón Nova Mesa (born May 22, 1966) is a Dominican professional baseball pitcher who played in Major League Baseball from 1987 through 2007. He played for the Baltimore Orioles, Cleveland Indians, San Francisco Giants, Seattle Mariners, Philadelphia Phillies, Pittsburgh Pirates, Colorado Rockies, and Detroit Tigers. He retired with 321 career saves.

Mesa was a two-time MLB All-Star and won the American League (AL) Rolaids Relief Man Award in 1995, when he led the AL in saves. His nickname was "Joe Table", the literal translation of his name in the English language.

Baseball career
Initially, Mesa was signed as an amateur free agent by the Toronto Blue Jays in 1981, originally as an outfielder. He was sent from the Blue Jays to the Orioles on September 4, 1987 to complete a transaction from four days prior on August 31 when Oswaldo Peraza was traded to Baltimore for Mike Flanagan. Mesa began his major-league career as a starting pitcher with the Orioles, who hoped that Mesa's superior fastball would earn him success in the starting role. After 48 starts of below-average results during four seasons, Mesa was traded from the Orioles to the Indians for minor-league outfielder Kyle Washington on July 14, 1992.

In the role of closer during the  season, Mesa pitched superbly; in 64 innings pitched over 62 appearances, Mesa had a 1.13 ERA, saved 46 games in 48 chances, and earned three wins. Thirty-eight of Mesa's 46 saves were recorded in consecutive appearances in save situations; this was a major-league record at the time. Mesa's performance in 1995 was critical in the Indians' 100–44 regular-season record and their first World Series appearance since . That year, Mesa finished second in AL Cy Young voting and fourth in AL MVP voting.

In , Mesa's 2.40 ERA, 16 saves, and four wins helped the Indians to their second World Series appearance in three seasons; however, he failed to hold a one-run lead in the ninth inning of Game 7 of the 1997 World Series, and Cleveland traded him midway through the following season. Following his departure from Cleveland, he pitched for the San Francisco Giants and Seattle Mariners, but without much success. In 2001, he signed with the Philadelphia Phillies and enjoyed a two-year run of success. However, in 2003 his ERA more than doubled, and he was granted free agency at the end of the season. He spent 2004 and 2005 pitching for the Pittsburgh Pirates, and pitched for the Colorado Rockies in 2006.

On December 10, he signed with the Detroit Tigers. He was released by the team on June 3, . In 16 appearances with the team, he was 1-1 with a 12.34 ERA. On June 8, 2007 he signed a minor league deal with the Phillies. He appeared in 40 games for the Phillies, compiling a 1-2 record with a 5.54 ERA, and retired following the 2007 season.

Highlights
 American League All-Star (twice, 1995–96)
 Relief Man of the Year Award (1995)
 TSN Reliever of the Year Award (1995)
 Led AL in saves (46, 1995)
 Led AL in games finished (57, 1995)
 His 321 career saves rank him 13th on the all-time list
 His 112 career saves ranks second all-time in Philadelphia Phillies history

Controversies
Mesa was involved in a longstanding feud with former teammate Omar Vizquel following the publication of Vizquel's autobiography, Omar! My Life On and Off the Field. In the book, Vizquel criticized Mesa's performance in Game 7 of the 1997 World Series, in which Mesa came in with the Indians leading 2-1 and 3 outs away from their first championship in 49 years, only to blow the save and allow Florida to tie the game: "The eyes of the world were focused on every move we made. Unfortunately, Jose's own eyes were vacant. Completely empty. Nobody home. You could almost see right through him. Not long after I looked into his vacant eyes, he blew the save and the Marlins tied the game." Mesa reacted furiously, pledging to hit Vizquel upon every subsequent opportunity: "Even my little boy told me to get him. If I face him 10 more times, I'll hit him 10 times. I want to kill him." 

By the end of the 2007 season, Mesa had hit Vizquel on three separate occasions. Vizquel expressed regret in 2014 about what happened due to his comments about Mesa (which he also stated were misinterpreted) but Mesa and Vizquel have never reconciled, to the point where Mesa said he hadn't spoken to Vizquel in over a decade and had no plans to ever talk to him again. Mesa was later charged with one count of rape for allegedly penetrating one woman with his finger and two counts of gross sexual imposition for allegedly groping two women in a Lakewood, Ohio motel room on December 22, 1996. Mesa was acquitted of all charges on April 9, 1997.

Personal life
Mesa's son, José Mesa Jr., is also a pitcher who played in the minor leagues in the New York Yankees' and Baltimore Orioles' organizations and, as of 2021, plays in the Miami Marlins organization.

See also

 List of Major League Baseball annual saves leaders

References

External links

José Mesa at SABR (Baseball BioProject)
Indians All-Time Team
court TV becomes truTV

1966 births
Living people
American League All-Stars
American League saves champions
Baltimore Orioles players
Cleveland Indians players
Colorado Rockies players
Detroit Tigers players
Dominican Republic expatriate baseball players in the United States
Florence Blue Jays players
Gulf Coast Blue Jays players
Hagerstown Suns players
Kinston Blue Jays players
Knoxville Blue Jays players

Major League Baseball pitchers
Major League Baseball players from the Dominican Republic
Philadelphia Phillies players
Pittsburgh Pirates players
Rochester Red Wings players
San Francisco Giants players
Seattle Mariners players
Toledo Mud Hens players
Ventura County Gulls players